Panoor is a Municipality in the district of Kannur in the state of Kerala, India. The town is the main market place for the farmer communities in the surrounding regions. Panoor is one of the main suburbs of the City of Thalassery. Panoor got municipal status when the Government of Kerala decided to upgrade Panoor Grama Panchayat and added with other Panchayats, as Panoor Municipality in 2015.

History
The  Kolathunadu  emerged  into  independent 10 principalities i.e., Kadathanadu (Vadakara), Randathara or Poyanad (Dharmadom), Kottayam (Thalassery), Nileshwaram, Iruvazhinadu (Panoor), Kurumbranad etc.,   under   separate   royal   chieftains   due   to   the   outcome   of   internal dissensions. The Nileshwaram dynasty on the northernmost part of Kolathiri dominion, were relatives to both Kolathunadu as well as the Zamorin of Calicut, in the early medieval period. Panoor was under Iruvazhinadu.

Location 
Panoor is about 11 km from Thalassery, 33 km from Kannur, 174 km from Mangalore, 11 km from New Mahe 9 km from Peringathur, and about 10 km from Kuthuparamba.

Demographics
 India census, Panoor has a population of 17,438. Males constitute 46% of the population and females 54%.  Panoor has an average literacy rate of 82%, higher than the national average of 59.5%: male literacy is 83%, and female literacy is 81%. In Panoor, 12% of the population is under 6 years of age.

Civic Administration
The town is administered by the Panoor Municipality, headed by a chairman. For administrative purposes, the town is divided into 40 wards, from which the members of the municipal council are elected for five years. The municipality is currently administered by UDF with V. Nasar as the municipal chairman.

Panoor Municipality Election 2020

Politics
The major political parties in Panoor area are CPIM, IUML, INC and BJP. Panoor municipality is politically a part of Kuthuparamba Assembly constituency which is a part of Vatakara Lok Sabha constituency. Prior to 2008, Panoor was a part of Peringalam Assembly constituency.

Political violence
This area is an epicenter of political violence between RSS and Communists.  Communist Party of India (Marxist) (CPI(M)) and the Hindus-led Rashtriya Swayamsevak Sangh (RSS) have been fighting in this area for supremacy for the last 50 years.  Clashes in 2008 left seven people killed and many have been injured. The High Court of Kerala called this manslaughter a "compelling sport" and suggested permanent deployment of Central forces in the affected areas.

Transport 
State Highway 38 passes through Panoor town connects the cities of Kannur (Chovva) and Kozhikode (Puthiyangadi). The roads in Panoor are well laid out, although the condition of the roads is generally affected during the monsoon season. The nearest entry point to the National Highway 66 is Kunhippalli which is 11km from Panoor.  The nearest airport Kannur International Airport is about 20km away. The nearest railway station is at Thalassery about 11km from Panoor.

Educational Institutes
 MECF College of Teacher Education, Peringathur
 Mahatma Gandhi Arts and Science College, Chendayad
 Panoor Higher Secondary School 
 KKV MEMORIAL HSS,Panoor
 NAM MEMORIAL HSS, Peringathur
 Rajeev Gandhi Memorial Higher Secondary School
 Zahra Public School
 Kannamvelli L.P School

Famous personalities
 Puthanpurayil Ramunni Kurup - commonly known as P. R. Kurup was an Indian socialist leader and former minister of Kerala state.
 K. Panoor - Indian civil rights activist and writer
 V.P. Sathyan - Indian professional footballer

See also
 Peringathur
 Kariyad
 Mokeri

References

Cities and towns in Kannur district